Chamaesphecia diabarensis is a moth of the family Sesiidae. It is found in north-eastern Turkey, Azerbaijan and Armenia.

The larvae feed on Marrubium species.

References

Moths described in 1987
Sesiidae